Laboissière may refer to:

 Places
 Laboissière-en-Santerre, Somme, France
 Laboissière-en-Thelle, Oise, France

 People with the surname
 Pierre Garnier de Laboissière (1755–1809), French general

See also 
 La Boissière (disambiguation)